Luchko is a gender-neutral Ukrainian surname. Notable people with the surname include:

Klara Luchko (1925–2005), Soviet actress
Yuri Luchko, German mathematician

See also
 

Ukrainian-language surnames